Sebastian Harrison White (December 24, 1864 – December 21, 1945) was a U.S. Representative from Colorado and a justice of the Colorado Supreme Court.

Early life and education
Born on a farm near Maries County, Missouri, his parents were Jonah William and Cloa Ann (Reeder) White. His father was from Tennessee and his mother was from Virginia. White attended the rural schools in Dallas County, Missouri and private schools. At the age of ten, White set out on his own, having been "thrown upon his own resources." When he was 16 years of age, he worked as a laborer and was living at the home of a physician and his wife in Lincoln County in Dallas County. He attended the Marionville Collegiate Institute in Missouri (later the Ozark Wesleyan College) at Carthage, Missouri).

Career
He taught school for several years. At 19 years of age, White was elected president of the Hickory County Teachers Institute in 1886. He was elected superintendent of schools of Hickory County, Missouri in 1887 at 23 years of age.

He studied law while he was a teacher and he was admitted to the bar in Colorado and Missouri in 1889 and practiced law in Pueblo, Colorado. He was a partner with Charles P. Dunbaugh in the White & Dunbaugh law firm.

He served as delegate to the Democratic State convention in 1892. He served as chairman of the Pueblo County Democratic central committee in 1892. He served as city attorney of Pueblo from 1897 to 1899. He was a public trustee of Pueblo County from 1900 to 1903 and from 1905 to 1909. He served as district attorney of the tenth judicial district from 1904 to 1908.

White was elected justice of the Colorado Supreme Court in 1908 for a term of ten years 1909 to 1919, and served as chief justice from 1917 until 1918, when he retired. He engaged in the practice of law in Denver, Colorado in 1919.

White was elected as a Democrat to the 70th Congress to fill the vacancy caused by the death of William N. Vaile and served from November 15, 1927 to March 3, 1929. He was an unsuccessful candidate for reelection in 1928 to the 71st Congress. He resumed the practice of law in Denver, Colorado.

He was the author of the minority report that precipitated the fight over the fusion with the Populists that resulted in a split in the convention. He was elected secretary of that division of the party which was denominated “The White Wings”, and which nominated a straight Democratic ticket.

He was a member of the American Bar Association, Elks, Knights of Pythias, and the Denver Athletic Club. He was a lecturer across the United States when he was a member of the League to Enforce Peace. His office was in the Equitable Building in Denver.

Personal life
He married Eva Dunbaugh of Pueblo, Colorado in December 1893. Her father was Charles P. Dunbaugh, a hotelier in Pueblo. They had two children: Adrian Dunbaugh White and Gertrude Gloria White.

White was admitted into a hospital in Colorado Springs, Colorado in 1942, where he remained until his death on December 21, 1945. He remains were cremated in Fairmount Cemetery (Denver, Colorado), and the ashes scattered over the cemetery.

References

1864 births
1945 deaths
Democratic Party members of the United States House of Representatives from Colorado
Missouri Democrats
Justices of the Colorado Supreme Court
Chief Justices of the Colorado Supreme Court
District attorneys in Colorado